Katarzyna Nowak (born 13 January 1969) is a former professional tennis player from Poland.

Biography

Professional tour
Nowak, who comes from Łódź, turned professional at the age of 19.

On the WTA Tour, her best performance was a semifinal appearance at the 1995 Barcelona Open. Soon after, she beat Kimberly Po and Meredith McGrath to make the third round of the 1995 French Open, then months later reached her career-high ranking of 47 in the world.

Representative
Nowak first played for the Poland Fed Cup team in 1988 in Melbourne, were Poland played against Italy and lost 1–2. The only one point won Katarzyna Nowak who beat Laura Garrone. She won a total of nine singles matches in the Fed Cup, the most famous of which came in 1991, over Nathalie Tauziat in Nottingham, to help Poland eliminate sixth seeded France from the tournament.

The best result came in 1992 when Poland achieved quarterfinal of Fed Cup which is the best results in Polish tennis history. Poland beat Israel 3–0 and Sweden 2–1 Katarzyna Nowak in her single mach against Israel defeated Anna Smashnova and against Sweden she defeated Catarina Lindqvist.

In addition to Fed Cup representation, Nowak also competed for Poland at the 1992 Summer Olympics in Barcelona. She was a first Polish tennis player who represented her country in the Olympic Games. She lost in the first round of the singles to Julie Halard-Decugis.

ITF finals

Singles (6–5)

Doubles (0–3)

References

External links
 
 
 

1969 births
Living people
Polish female tennis players
Sportspeople from Łódź
Tennis players at the 1992 Summer Olympics
Olympic tennis players of Poland
20th-century Polish women
21st-century Polish women